Richard Eisen (born June 24, 1969) is an American television sportscaster and radio host. Since 2003, he has worked for NFL Network as a host of various pregame, halftime, and postgame shows. He also hosts a daily sports radio show, The Rich Eisen Show. From 1996 to 2003, he worked at ESPN, most prominently as an anchor of SportsCenter.

Early life and education 
Eisen was born in Brooklyn, New York, and was raised on Staten Island. Eisen attended the University of Michigan, where he served as co–sports editor of the school's Michigan Daily and member of the Pi Kappa Phi fraternity. He graduated in 1990 with a Bachelor of Arts degree, and in 1994 he earned a Master of Science degree in journalism from the Medill School of Journalism at Northwestern University.

Broadcasting career

Early years (1990–1996) 
Eisen was first a staff writer for the Staten Island Advance from 1990 to 1993, and the Chicago Tribune in 1993 and 1994. He was then a sports anchor and reporter at KRCR-TV in Redding, California, from 1994 to 1996, and also worked in television as the Medill News Service's Washington correspondent (1994).

ESPN (1996–2003) 
Before working for the NFL Network, he worked for ESPN. He was part of a duo with Stuart Scott, and became well known for his humor, most notably his impressions of Atlanta Braves broadcaster Skip Caray and provided interviews during the Home Run Derby. Eisen was also the host of ESPN's reality series, Beg, Borrow & Deal. For ESPN Radio, he served as host of Major League Baseball and as a guest host on The Tony Kornheiser Show and The Dan Patrick Show. Outside of the world of sports, Eisen hosted the ABC show Domino Day.

Among Eisen's notable achievements while at ESPN, was breaking the news of St. Louis slugger Mark McGwire's retirement from baseball in 2001 on SportsCenter. Days later, he sat down with McGwire for an exclusive interview elaborating on the decision.

NFL Network (2003–present) 
Rich Eisen was the first on-air talent added to the NFL Network roster in June 2003. He was the main host of NFL Total Access, the network's flagship program, until August 2011.
Eisen signed a new long-term deal with NFL Network in 2010 and became the new host of NFL GameDay Morning, the first pregame show on the NFL Network. Eisen also remains host of NFL GameDay Highlights, as well as NFL Network's Thursday Night Football pregame, halftime and postgame shows and special on-location coverage from league events such as Kickoff, Pro Football Hall of Fame, NFL Scouting Combine, NFL Draft and Super Bowl.

Eisen expanded his résumé in 2010 with the debut of "The Rich Eisen Podcast," the first-ever podcast for NFL.com. The weekly podcast, available on Apple Podcasts among many other sources, features guests from the world of sports and entertainment news talking football and all the latest headlines. Since its debut, the podcast has been downloaded more than seven million times and celebrated its 200th episode. Eisen hosts his nationally syndicated sports talk radio show with Chris Brockman, Michael Del Tufo, and TJ Jefferson.

In November 2012, Eisen's first Thanksgiving Special aired on the NFL Network with a variety of celebrity guests talking mostly sports and current events.

In 2005, Terrell Davis challenged Eisen to compete in the 40-yard dash at the NFL Scouting Combine.
Eisen runs it annually, wearing a suit, and his times are:

That makes his best time 5.94, in 2016.

Eisen turned his annual sprint into a charitable campaign "#RunRichRun" which raises money for St. Jude Children's Research Hospital.  His campaign has already raised over 2.5 million dollars  and for his work he was honored with the 2017 Pat Summerall Award. A graphic based on one of his runs is the trademark of his weekday radio and television talk show.

The Rich Eisen Show (2014–present) 

On October 6, 2014, Eisen began a new sportstalk TV/radio show, The Rich Eisen Show. The show was broadcast live from DirecTV's El Segundo, California Studios on Audience Network and NFL Now.

On November 3, 2014, the show was picked up by Fox Sports Radio and  broadcast daily from noon-3 p.m. ET. Eisen took over the slot from Jay Mohr, who moved to the 3–6 p.m. slot.

In early March 2020, the show's broadcast moved from Audience to YouTube due to the impending shutdown of Audience. NBCSN and eventually NBC's streaming service Peacock would pick up the show later in 2020. The program would move again, to The Roku Channel in September 2022.

When the show moved to The Roku Channel, it also moved to a new location on Sirius XM satellite radio and Internet streaming, after several years on NBC Sports Audio; it is now available on Sirius 216, XM 202, and SXM app channel 992.

In 2022, the show was nominated for the Outstanding Studio Show Sports Emmy Award.

Other networks/shows 

Eisen was the host of the TNT original reality series, The Great Escape, which debuted on June 24, 2012, and was cancelled in October 2012.

From 2015 to 2017, Eisen had a recurring role as himself on the CBS sitcom The Odd Couple, playing the arch rival of fictional sports radio personality Oscar Madison (Matthew Perry).

Since 2016, Eisen has appeared on multiple episodes of Comedy Central's @midnight.

In February 2018, Eisen co-hosted, with Rebecca Romijn, The American Rescue Dog Show on The Hallmark Channel.

In 2020, Eisen and The Rich Eisen Show are featured on Madden NFL 21: Face of The Franchise.

In 2022, Eisen was as guest star in 5 episodes of the Disney TV Series The Might Ducks: Game Changers.

Personal life 
Eisen is Jewish. In 2003, Eisen married Suzy Shuster, formerly a college football sideline reporter for ESPN on ABC. They have two sons and a daughter, and live near Coldwater Canyon in Beverly Hills, California.

Eisen wrote the book Total Access, which was published in 2007. In 2012, he started the "Punters Are People Too" movement after Bryan Anger was drafted by the Jacksonville Jaguars in the third round of the 2012 NFL Draft.

In 2014, he had a small cameo in the film Draft Day.

Eisen is a fan of the New York Jets, New York Yankees and Michigan Wolverines.

References

External links 
 
 

1969 births
American sports journalists
Living people
People from Brooklyn
People from Staten Island
University of Michigan alumni
Medill School of Journalism alumni
National Football League announcers
Tennis commentators
Major League Baseball broadcasters
Jewish American journalists
21st-century American journalists
20th-century American journalists
American male journalists
Journalists from New York City
The Michigan Daily alumni
21st-century American Jews